R. Peralta may refer to:

Rafael Peralta, a United States Marine.
Richard "Chad" Peralta, a Filipino-Australian actor and singer.